The Optical Music Series is a set of soundtracks by the English Neoclassical duo In The Nursery, released under their own ITN Corporation record label. These soundtrack are meant as companions to several classic silent films of the early 20th century. The series began in 1996 with the release of The Cabinet of Dr. Caligari and includes Carl Theodor Dreyer's The Passion of Joan of Arc and their most recent release, the 2019 soundtrack to The Seashell and the Clergyman.

List of releases 
The Cabinet of Dr. Caligari 1996
Asphalt 1997
Man With A Movie Camera 1999
Hindle Wakes 2001
A Page of Madness 2004
Electric Edwardians 2005
The Passion of Joan of Arc 2008
The Fall of the House of Usher 2015
The Seashell and the Clergyman 2019

External links 
 In The Nursery Optical Music Series

Silent film
Silent film music
Film soundtracks